Subhash Runwal is an Indian real estate entrepreneur, founder and chairman of Runwal Group. He has a net worth of 1 billion dollars. Mumbai property tycoon Subhash Runwal chairs the Runwal Group, known for building homes in the city and its suburbs It also owns several malls and counts the Singapore government's GIC as a key investor in that business. A trained accountant, Runwal was born in a small town in Maharashtra and migrated to Mumbai at age 21. He worked as an accountant for nearly a decade before taking the plunge into real estate in 1978.

Early life
Subhash Runwal was born on 25 May in a Marwadi Jain Family and was one of the five siblings, he left the town of Dhulia and went to study commerce in Pune city. After graduating in commerce, he decided to do his chartered accountancy and moved to Mumbai with less than $2 in his pocket at age 21.

Runwal Group
Subhash Runwal founded his real estate business Runwal Group in 1978 and purchased a 22 acres plot in central suburb of Mumbai.

Awards
 1. Samaj Ratna Award by President of India 2015

Associations
Subhash serves as president of Jain International Trade Organisation, president of Bharat Jain Mahamandal and treasurer of World Jain. He is trustee of the Mahavir Foundation and Subhash Runwal Education Foundation.

Family
Subhash is married to Chanda and have two son Sandeep, Subodh and one daughter Sangeeta. His son Sandeep Runwal and Subodh Runwal are now working with him in his real estate business.

References

Living people
1943 births
Businesspeople from Mumbai
Indian billionaires
Indian real estate businesspeople